MPL may refer to:

Arts and entertainment
 MPL Communications (or McCartney Publishing Limited), a music publisher
 Patrologia Latina, a collection of manuscripts compiled in the 19th century
 Puri Lukisan Museum, a gallery of Balinese art in Bali, Indonesia
 Mobile Premier League, an Indian online gaming platform

Library bodies
 Markham Public Library, Ontario, Canada
Memphis Public Library, Memphis, US
 Minneapolis Public Library, Minnesota, US
 Milwaukee Public Library, Wisconsin, US
 Milton Public Library, Wisconsin, US

Science and technology

Biology and medicine
 MPL (gene), which encodes the myeloproliferative leukemia protein (thrombopoietin receptor)
 Marfanoid–progeroid–lipodystrophy syndrome
 Medial patellar luxation, a medical condition in dogs
 Monophosphoryl lipid A, a derivative of the lipid A molecule

Computing

Copyright licenses
 Microsoft Public License
 Mozilla Public License

Programming
 Computer multitasking#Multiprogramming Limit, the degree of multiprogramming
 Matplotlib, a Python plotting library
 MIDI Programming Language
 PL/I, programming language
 Metaprogramming library, in Boost (C++ libraries)
 .mpl, a type of Perl module
 Mathematical Programming Language, for high-level optimization modeling

Other uses in computing
 Messenger Plus! Live, a software add-on for Windows Live Messenger
 .mpl, a Maconomy print layout file

Other uses in science and technology
 Magnetic path length
 Mars Polar Lander, a robotic spacecraft launched by NASA
 Max Planck Institute for the Science of Light, Erlangen, Germany
 Maximum parcel level, in meteorology and climatology
 Multi-photon lithography, a process used in microfabrication
 Walther MP, a series of submachine guns produced in Germany from 1963 to 1987

Sports
 Malaysia Premier League, a second-tier association football league in Malaysia
 Mexican Pacific League, a winter baseball league in Mexico
 Miyazaki Phoenix League, an autumnal baseball league in Japan
 Mangalore Premier League, a cricket league in Karnataka, India

Transportation
 Marple railway station, England (GBR code: MPL)
 Minnesota Prairie Line, a railroad in Central Minnesota
 Montpellier-Méditerranée Airport, Montpellier, France (IATA code: MPL)
 Multi-pilot license, an airline training program

Other uses
 Malian Party of Labour, a political party in Mali
 Marginal product of labor (MPL), in economics